A volunteer military system or all volunteer military system (AVMS) is a military service system that maintains the military only with applicants without compulsory conscription. A country may offer attractive pay and benefits through military recruitment to attract potential recruits. Many countries with volunteer militaries reserve the right to renew conscription in the event of an emergency.

The Indian Army is the world's largest standing volunteer army.

In recent decades, the trend among numerous countries has been to move from conscription to all-volunteer military forces. One significant example is in France, which has historically been the first to introduce modern conscription and whose model was followed by many other countries in Europe and elsewhere around the world.

Volunteer military

 

 (de facto, conscription not enforced)

See also 
 Conscription
 Mercenaries
 Military service
 Military volunteer
 United States Volunteers
 Volunteer Force (Great Britain)

Further reading 
 
 
 
 
 
 

Types of military forces